Parlevliet & van der Plas is a privately owned international fisheries company  based in the Netherlands, founded in 1949 by Dirk Parlevliet and brothers Dirk and Jan van der Plas.

The company began by purchasing herring at auctions for resale, eventually expanding into operating a large fleet of fishing trawlers operating globally. They are exporters of seafood to Africa and suppliers of fish for zoos.

Parlevliet & van der Plas is certified by the Marine Stewardship Council.

The company operates a 6500 m2 freezing store on Faroe Islands, Denmark.

In 2018 P & V bought the biggest German Fish company "Deutsche See"

Spread of operations 

The firm regularly enters into other fisheries through acquisitions.

Regular acquisitions with partners make the spread of the company extensive, across different fisheries in the world.

Criticisms 

In 2013, Greenpeace lodged a legal complaint against Parlevliet & van der Plas for the alleged dumping of 1.5 million kg of fish into the ocean.

In 2012 and 2015 the firm introduced Super trawlers into Australian waters, utilising the Tasmanian firm Seafish Tasmania.  The presence of the trawlers in Australian waters provoked widespread criticism of Seafish Tasmania, and Parlevliet & van der Plas.

Fleet

Pelagic 

Annelies Ilena 	(KW174)
Annie Hillina 	(ROS170)
Dirk Dirk 	(KW172)
Helen Mary 	(ROS 785)
Jan Maria 	(BX791)
Maartje Theadora    	(ROS 171)
Margiris 	(KL855)
Naeraberg 	(KG14)

Demersal 

Andre Leduc 	(BL 924680)
Arosa Catorce 	(3 CO-2-3846)
Arosa Doce 	(3 CO-2-3845)
Bressay Bank 	(BL 900470)
Cap Nord 	(BL 734 690)
Cap Saint Georges 	(BL 924675)
Dorado 	(LVL 2133)
Farnella 	(H 135)
Grande Hermine 	(SM 640670)
Joseph Roty 	(SM 199078)
Klondyke 	(FHPJ)
Mark 	(ROS 777)
Nordic 2 	(BL 341160)
Ocean Tiger 	(R 38)
Kirkella 	(2HF18)
Haltenbank II 	(BL 931410)
Santa Princesa 	(V-1108-N)
Dorado 	(ROS 804)
Nida 	(KL759)
Gerda Maria 	(ROS 783)
Joseph Roty II  	(SM 199078)

Notes 

1949 establishments in the Netherlands
Food and drink companies established in 1949
Fishing companies
Companies based in South Holland